Colle di Sampeyre is a mountain pass in the province of Cuneo in the Cottian Alps. It connects the Varaita valley and the Maira valley.

The Colle di Sampeyre can be climbed from Stroppo, Sampeyre and Elva. It has been featured in the Giro d'Italia twice, in 1995 and 2003.

See also
 List of highest paved roads in Europe
 List of mountain passes

References

External links

Colle di Sampeyre/Sampeire/Col d’Sampeyre on cycloclimbing.com

Mountain passes of the Alps
Mountain passes of Piedmont
Transport in Piedmont
Sampeyre